Haidian Huangzhuang Station is a station on Line 4 and Line 10 of the Beijing Subway, located in Haidian District. This transfer station handled peak passenger traffic of 251,500 people on May 5, 2013.

Station Layout 
The line 4 station has an underground island platform. The line 10 station has 2 underground side platforms.

Exits 
There are 5 exits, lettered A1, A2, B, C, and D. Exits A1 and C are accessible.

Gallery

Around the station
 Haidian Mosque
 Haidian Centre

References

External links
 
 

Railway stations in China opened in 2009
Beijing Subway stations in Haidian District